Khvajeh Alivandan (also Romanized as Khvājeh ‘Alīvandān; also known as Khvājeh Mandān) is a village in Tulem Rural District, Tulem District, Sowme'eh Sara County, Gilan Province, Iran. At the 2006 census, its population was 61, in 14 families.

References 

Populated places in Sowme'eh Sara County